Konrad Kumor (born 11 April 2000) is a Polish footballer who plays as a right-back for Szczakowianka Jaworzno.

Career

Zagłębie Sosnowiec
On 2 August 2019 Zagłębie Sosnowiec announced that Kumor had joined LZS Starowice Dolne on loan for the 2019-20 season.

KS Wiązownica
On 21 August 2020, he signed with KS Wiązownica in the III liga.

References

External links

2000 births
People from Sosnowiec
Sportspeople from Silesian Voivodeship
Polish footballers
Living people
Zagłębie Sosnowiec players
Szczakowianka Jaworzno players
Association football defenders
Ekstraklasa players
III liga players